Chirag Gulshan Khurana (born 3 November 1992) is an Indian cricketer who plays for Maharashtra cricket team in domestic cricket. He is an all-rounder who bats right-handed, and bowls right-arm off break.

He was the leading wicket-taker for Maharashtra in the 2017–18 Ranji Trophy, with 21 dismissals in five matches.

References

External links
 

Indian cricketers
Living people
1992 births
Maharashtra cricketers
People from Kaithal
Cricketers from Haryana